Go Slow Down is the BoDeans' fifth studio album, and was released on October 12, 1993. It peaked at number 127 on the Billboard 200 chart.

Overview
After taking a more pop approach to Black and White, the band wished to return to a simpler sound and record an album that they were truly happy with. They began setting up a studio in a rented storefront and called upon T-Bone Burnett (producer of their debut album) to work with them once again, this time in an executive producer role. They originally tracked 30 songs live as a full band, but under the advice of their record label, all except for "Closer to Free" were re-recorded with Kurt Neumann playing most of the instruments himself. The resulting album was more acoustic and laid-back. In 1996, "Closer to Free" was selected as the theme song to the TV series Party of Five. It was subsequently re-released as a single and became the band's biggest hit.

Reception
Music critic William Ruhlmann, writing for AllMusic, wrote that the album "may have been the statement of a band that had been through a lot and reached a point of emotional exhaustion, but the BoDeans used their experience to craft their most deeply felt and satisfying music."  Likewise, Thom Jurek of Rolling Stone stated: "Go Slow Down reveals the BoDeans in firm control of their musical vision" and "is perhaps the finest album to date by a band that keeps on growing. With any justice, it should make the BoDeans more than critics' favorites."

Track listing
All songs written by Kurt Neumann and Sam Llanas.
 "Closer to Free" - 3:08
 "Save a Little" - 4:03
 "In Trow / Texas Ride Song" - 5:18
 "Go Slow Down" - 3:37
 "Idaho" - 4:39
 "Freedom" - 4:34
 "The Other Side" - 3:02
 "Stay On" - 5:40
 "Feed the Fire" - 3:43
 "Cold Winter's Day" - 4:21
 "Something's Telling Me" - 5:57
 "So Fine" - 2:39

Personnel
BoDeans
 Kurt Neumann - vocals, electric guitar, acoustic guitar, drums, slide guitar, mandolin, 6-string bass, tambourine, hand claps, sandpaper
 Sam Llanas - vocals, acoustic guitar, harmonica, howling
 Michael Ramos - keyboards, piano, organ, accordion
 Bob Griffin - bass guitar, acoustic bass, fretless bass
Additional personnel
 Kenny Aronoff - drums on tracks #1, #7

References

1993 albums
BoDeans albums
Albums produced by T Bone Burnett
Slash Records albums